Lisa Walker is a contemporary New Zealand jeweller.

Lisa Walker may also refer to:

Lisa Walker (curler) in British Columbia Scotties Tournament of Hearts
Lisa Walker, musician in Wussy
Lisa Walker, protagonist in Bed of Roses (1996 film)

See also
Elizabeth Walker (disambiguation)
Liza Walker (born 1972), British actress